Structural composite supercapacitors are multifunctional materials that can both bear mechanical load and store electrical energy. Combined with structural batteries, they would presumably enable an overall weight reduction of electric vehicles.

Typically structural composite supercapacitors are based on the design of carbon fibre reinforced polymers. Carbon fibres act as mechanical reinforcement, current collector and eventually electrodes. The matrix is a structural polymer electrolyte that transfers load via shear mechanism between the fibres and has a reasonable ionic conductivity.

In a supercapacitor, the specific capacitance is proportional to the specific surface area of the electrodes. Structural carbon fibres usually have low specific surface area and it is therefore necessary to modify their surface to enable sufficient energy storage ability. To increase the specific surface area of the structural electrodes, several methods have been employed, mainly consisting in the modification of the surface of the carbon fibre itself or by coating the carbon fibre with a high specific surface area material. 

Physical and chemical activation of the carbon fibres have increased two orders of magnitude of their specific surface area without damaging their mechanical properties, yet limited energy storage ability when combined with a structural polymer electrolyte. Coating carbon fibres with carbon nanotubes, carbon aerogel, or graphene nanoplatelets allowed for higher energy densities.

References 

Capacitors
Energy conversion
Electric vehicles
Composite materials